Qajar Ab-e Sofla (also Romanized as Qajar Āb-e Soflá; also known as Qajarāb and Qajar Āb) is a village in Kuh Sardeh Rural District, in the Central District of Malayer County, Hamadan Province, Iran. At the 2006 census, its population was 50, in 13 families.

References 

Populated places in Malayer County